White Crosses is Against Me!'s fifth studio album, and their second to be released on Sire Records. As with its predecessor, 2007's New Wave, the album was produced by Butch Vig. It is also the only Against Me! album to feature George Rebelo, drummer of Hot Water Music, following the departure of previous drummer Warren Oakes.

Recording began in August 2009, finishing two months later. The mixing and mastering of the album finished in February 2010, and it was released June 8. The initial pressing of the record included four bonus tracks. This is also the last album prior to Laura Jane Grace’s transition.

On March 17, 2010, their first video from the album, "Rapid Decompression," was released online via AOL Spinner. A four-track digital EP for "I Was a Teenage Anarchist" was released as the first single from the album, on April 7, 2010.

The two outtakes from the White Crosses sessions are "David Johansen's Soul", of which an acoustic version was released on Black Crosses, and "Dead Generations", which remains unreleased in any form.

Reception

White Crosses received generally favorable critical reception, despite being leaked three months before its retail release date. The album was mainly praised for its success in merging Against Me!'s long-time punk rock style with, according to critics, a newfound ethos of "arena-" or "radio rock", through its melody and "big" sound.

Track listing

Bonus tracks

Black Crosses

In 2011 Against Me! launched their own record label, Total Treble Music, reissuing White Crosses with an added disc titled Black Crosses consisting of demos from 2009 (referred to as the Goldentone Studio versions) and acoustic sessions from 2010. The reissue features original artwork by Steak Mtn and a 32-page booklet with lyrics and additional artwork, and was released July 26, 2011, on compact disc and as a music download, and August 9 as a triple LP; it became available in the UK and Europe in November from the band's UK label Xtra Mile Recordings.

Track listing

Charts

Personnel

Band
 Laura Jane Grace – lead vocals, guitar
 James Bowman – guitar, backing vocals
 Andrew Seward – bass guitar, backing vocals
 George Rebelo – drums, backing vocals
 Warren Oakes – drums, backing vocals on Black Crosses (tracks 1, 4–5, 7–11, 14)

Additional musicians
 Zac Rae – additional keyboards on White Crosses (tracks 3, 5)
 Jon Gaunt – fiddle on White Crosses (track 12), Black Crosses (track 7)
 Ron McGregor – mouth harp on White Crosses (track 12)

Production
 Butch Vig – producer
 Billy Bush – recording engineer
 Chris Steffen – assistant engineer
 Alan Moulder – mix engineer
 Darren Lawson – mix assistant
 Emily Lazar and Joe LaPorta – mastering

Art and design
 Christopher Norris and Laura Jane Grace –  art direction
 Steak Mtn – design, typography, and illustration
 Autumn deWilde – band photography

References

2010 albums
Sire Records albums
Against Me! albums
Albums produced by Butch Vig
Power pop albums by American artists